is a Japanese wheelchair athlete.

Career 
Hokinoue's career began in 2002, two years after he sustained a spinal cord injury in a motorcycle accident.

His first marathon was at the 2008 Summer Paralympics, where he placed 5th with a time of 1:23:22.  His marathon best is 1:22:01, which he attained at the 2011 Oensingen Wheelchair Marathon; this time became the Japanese record.  Hokinoue also holds Japanese records for 5000 m and 10,000 m races.

References

External links 
Official page 

1974 births
Living people
People with paraplegia
Japanese male wheelchair racers
Sportspeople from Fukuoka (city)
Paralympic wheelchair racers
Paralympic athletes of Japan
Athletes (track and field) at the 2008 Summer Paralympics
Athletes (track and field) at the 2012 Summer Paralympics
Athletes (track and field) at the 2016 Summer Paralympics
Medalists at the 2010 Asian Para Games
Medalists at the World Para Athletics Championships